Rachel Mary Owen (30 November 1968 – 18 December 2016) was a Welsh photographer, printmaker and lecturer on medieval Italian literature. She was married to the Radiohead singer Thom Yorke; they announced their separation in 2015.

Life and career 
Owen was born in Cardiff, Wales. She received a B.A. (Hons) in Italian and Fine Art (Painting), specialising in Printmaking, from the University of Exeter. In the 1990s, she lived in Florence with two students and studied painting at the Accademia di Belle Arti of Florence, where she fell in love with Dante's work. In 2001, Owen received a PhD from the University of London, where her research was on the illustrations in manuscripts of Dante Alighieri's Divine Comedy.

Owen was a lecturer in Italian with a focus on medieval Italian literature, where she examined illustration and its reception in Divine Comedy. She taught art history and Dante studies for visiting students at the University of Oxford.

Owen was also a fine-art printmaker and a member of the Oxford Printmakers Co-operative. She mixed photography with printmaking and her work explored ideas of transformation using photographic screenprints. Her artwork was used on the cover of the 1993 Radiohead single "Pop Is Dead".

Personal life 
For 23 years, Owen was in a relationship with the Radiohead singer Thom Yorke, whom she met while they were students at the University of Exeter. She and Yorke had a son, Noah, born in 2001, and a daughter, Agnes, born in 2004. Owen influenced the lyrics of Radiohead songs such as "I Might Be Wrong" and "Optimistic".

In 2012, Rolling Stone reported that Owen and Yorke were not married. However, The Times later found that they had married in a secret ceremony in Oxfordshire in May 2003. In August 2015, the couple announced they had separated amicably "after 23 highly creative and happy years". Several critics believed the separation influenced the lyrics of Radiohead's 2016 album A Moon Shaped Pool.

Death
Owen died of cancer on 18 December 2016 at the age of 48. She continued to teach Italian into her final months. Radiohead dedicated the 2017 OKNOTOK reissue of their 1997 album OK Computer to her memory.

Works

Books
Rachel Owen: Illustrations for Dante's 'Inferno'. Oxford: Bodleian Library, 2021. Edited by David Bowe. .

Exhibitions 
 2015: Ballon Rouge Art, Thame, Oxfordshire, England, 7–15 November 2015

Papers

References 

1968 births
2016 deaths
20th-century Welsh women artists
21st-century Welsh women artists
Alumni of Royal Holloway, University of London
Alumni of the University of Exeter
Artists from Cardiff
British printmakers
Deaths from cancer in England
Welsh women photographers
Women printmakers